Udea renalis is a moth in the family Crambidae. It was described by Frederic Moore in 1888. It is found in India in Darjeeling and Sikkim.

References

renalis
Moths described in 1888